is a railway station in the town of Rifu, Miyagi, Japan, operated by East Japan Railway Company (JR East).

Lines
Shin-Rifu Station is the only intermediate station on the Rifu Branch of the Tōhoku Main Line from Iwakiri Station to Rifu Station. It lies 2.5 km from Iwakiri Station. Most services operate through to and from Sendai Station.

Station layout
The unstaffed station consists of one side platform served by the single track. Two entrances lead to the platform. one for general passengers, and one linking directly to the adjacent JR East Sendai General Shinkansen Depot for use by JR East employees only.

History
The station opened on 1 April 1982. With the privatization of Japanese National Railways (JNR) on 1 April 1987, the station came under the control of JR East.

Surrounding area
The station is primarily used by employees at the adjacent JR East Sendai General Shinkansen Depot.

See also
 List of railway stations in Japan

References

External links

 

Stations of East Japan Railway Company
Railway stations in Miyagi Prefecture
Tōhoku Main Line
Railway stations in Japan opened in 1982
Rifu, Miyagi